The Cache La Poudre River Corridor National Heritage Area extends along the flood plain of the Cache La Poudre River in Colorado, USA. The designation provides a framework for the promotion and interpretation of the area's cultural and historic character, and the preservation of the natural and built environment, and is administered by the Poudre Heritage Alliance.

Significant historic and cultural resources include the Greeley No. 3 Ditch and the Bellvue Hydrological Laboratory, which were instrumental in the development of a means to deliver regulated irrigation water to farms and towns in the western United States.

References

External links

 Cache La Poudre River Corridor at the Poudre Heritage Alliance
 Cache La Poudre River Corridor at the National Park Service

Protected areas of Larimer County, Colorado
Protected areas of Weld County, Colorado
National Heritage Areas of the United States
History of the Rocky Mountains